The third season of the Date A Live anime series, titled Date A Live III, was produced by J.C.Staff and directed by Keitaro Motonaga. Like the rest of the series, it follows the adventures of Shido Itsuka and the Spirits, supernatural female entities that have fallen in love with him. This season adapts volumes 8 to 12 of the light novels by Kōshi Tachibana and Tsunako. Date A Live III ran from January 11 to March 29, 2019, on Tokyo MX in Japan. The opening theme is titled "I Swear" performed by sweet ARMS, and the ending theme is "Last Promise" performed by Eri Yamazaki. Crunchyroll simulcast the third season, while Funimation produced a simuldub. In Australia and New Zealand, AnimeLab simulcast the third season.


Episode list

Notes

References

External links
  
 

2019 Japanese television seasons
3